Chegeni or Chegini may refer to:

Places in Iran
 Chegini, Alborz, a village in Alborz Province  
 Chegeni, Ilam, a village in Ilam Province
 Chegeni-ye Olya, a village in Kermanshah Province
 Chegeni-ye Sofla, a village in Kermanshah Province
 Chegeni County, aka Dowreh County, in Lorestan Province
 Chegeni District, a district (bakhsh) in Chegeni County, Lorestan Province